GLOH (Gradient Location and Orientation Histogram) is a robust image descriptor that can be used in computer vision tasks. It is a SIFT-like descriptor that considers more spatial regions for the histograms. An intermediate vector is computed from 17 location and 16 orientation bins, for a total of 272-dimensions. Principal components analysis (PCA) is then used to reduce the vector size to 128 (same size as SIFT descriptor vector).

See also 
 Scale-invariant feature transform
  Speeded Up Robust Features
 LESH – Local Energy-based Shape Histogram
 Feature detection (computer vision)

References 
Krystian Mikolajczyk and Cordelia Schmid "A performance evaluation of local descriptors", IEEE Transactions on Pattern Analysis and Machine Intelligence, 10, 27, pp 1615--1630, 2005.

Feature detection (computer vision)